Ragnar "Sambo" Haugen (August 25, 1911 – October 8, 1964) was a Norwegian boxer who competed in the 1936 Summer Olympics.

In 1936 he eliminated in the second round of the lightweight class after losing his fight to Poul Kops.

References 

1911 births
1964 deaths
Lightweight boxers
Olympic boxers of Norway
Boxers at the 1936 Summer Olympics
Norwegian male boxers
20th-century Norwegian people